Sam Julius van Schaik is an English tibetologist.

Education 
He obtained a PhD in Tibetan Buddhist literature at the University of Manchester in 2000, with a dissertation on the translations of Dzogchen texts by Jigme Lingpa.

Career 
Since 1999 he has worked at the British Library in London, and is currently a project manager for the International Dunhuang Project, specialising in the study of Tibetan Buddhist manuscripts from Dunhuang.  He has also taught occasional courses at SOAS, University of London.

From 2003 to 2005 van Schaik worked on a project to catalogue Tibetan Tantric manuscripts in the Stein Collection of the British Library, and from 2005 to 2008 he worked on a project to study the palaeography of Tibetan manuscripts from Dunhuang, in an attempt to identify individual scribes.

In February 2019 van Schaik was appointed as the head of the Endangered Archives Programme at the British Library.

Books
Van Schaik is the author or co-author of:
 Approaching the Great Perfection: Simultaneous and Gradual Approaches to Dzogchen Practice in the Longchen Nyingtig (Boston: Wisdom Publications, 2004). 
 Tibetan Tantric Manuscripts from Dunhuang: A Descriptive Catalogue of the Stein Collection at the British Library, co-authored with Jacob Dalton (Leiden: Brill, 2006). 
 Tibet: A History (London: Yale University Press, 2011). 
 Manuscripts and Travellers: The Sino-Tibetan Documents of a Tenth-Century Buddhist Pilgrim, coauthored with Imre Galambos (Berlin: de Gruyter, 2012). 
 Tibetan Zen: Discovering a Lost Tradition (Boston & London: Snow Lion, 2015). 
The Spirit of Zen (Yale University Press, 2018), winner of the 2019 Tianzhu Book Prize for Excellence in Chan Studies
 Buddhist Magic: Divination, Healing, and Enchantment Through the Ages (Boulder: Shambhala 2020) 

His edited volumes include:
 Esoteric Buddhism at Dunhuang: Rites and Teachings for this Life and Beyond, co-edited with Matthew Kapstein (Leiden: Brill, 2010). 

He is also the translator of:
Dhongthog Rinpoche, The Sakya School of Tibetan Buddhism: A History, Translated by Sam van Schaik (Somerville, MA: Wisdom Publications, Inc., 2016).

References

External links 
 Sam van Schaik's academic blog

Employees of the British Library
Living people
Tibetologists
Year of birth missing (living people)
Alumni of the University of Manchester
English historians